The People with the Dogs (1952) is a novel by Australian writer Christina Stead.

Story outline

Edward Massine has returned home to New York from the Second World War to a doting family.  The last of his line he is in a comfortable position that he finds very difficult to break away from.  He waits too long to marry his long-term girlfriend who chooses another, but subsequently meets and marries Lydia, an actress, finally exchanging his suffocating family life for a bright new future.

Critical reception

A reviewer in Kirkus Review found good and not-so-good points with the book: "An acrid, often amusing, occasionally tiresome probing of a rather squashy segment of New York City's population and also an examination of the problem of nonconformity in contemporary society - a novel sounding some telling notes which unfortunately evaporate into the thin upper air of attenuated symbolism."

In 2011 Edmund White listed the novel as one of his "top 10 New York Books" in The Guardian: "A study of indolent, comfortable New Yorkers in the period just after the war.  These are people who are constantly visiting one another, sitting on their stoops, playing with their pets, enjoying life to the fullest.  I can think of no other novel that is so agreeable and so devoid of incident."

See also

 1952 in Australian literature

References

Novels by Christina Stead
1952 Australian novels